Lemogang Kwape is a Motswana politician, who currently serves as Minister of Foreign Affairs and MP for Kanye South.

Ministerial roles 

 Minister of Health and Wellness (until 2020)
 Minister of International Affairs and Cooperation (since 2020)

References 

Living people
Year of birth missing (living people)

21st-century Botswana politicians
Foreign Ministers of Botswana
Health ministers of Botswana
Members of the National Assembly (Botswana)
Place of birth missing (living people)